Revolution Summer was a social movement within the hardcore punk scene of Washington, D.C. that occurred during the summer of 1985.

Background and creation
 From the late-1970s through the early-1980s, Washington, DC had a thriving hardcore punk community. The short-lived scene is one of the most influential in the United States. Bad Brains were an early influence on the speed of hardcore punk and Straight edge came to fruition in the wake of Minor Threat. By 1984, the scene was awash in violence; skinheads came to hardcore punk concerts in DC to fight. Shows devolved into vandalism.

The tight-knit community around Dischord Records, who helped create the scene, decided to leave it and create a new alternative music scene in the city. This scene was to be more aware of the sexism of the traditional punk scene, embraced animal rights and vegetarianism, and was in opposition to moshing and violence at concerts.

See also
 Positive Force DC

References

Further reading
 
 
 

Hardcore punk
1985 in Washington, D.C.
Music of Washington, D.C.